Kind Men is a 1979 Soviet comedy film directed by Karen Shakhnazarov.

Plot 
The film tells about a swindler who went to the world of science and achieved success in it. Having settled in the Institute of Ancient Culture, he easily cheated all kinds of members of the academic council, defended his dissertation and became director.

Cast 
 Georgy Burkov		as Gordey Petrovich Kabachkov
 Tatyana Vasileva as Iraida Yaroslavna
 Nikolay Volkov Sr. as Yaroslav Borisovich Grebeshkov
 Vladimir Zeldin as Yevgeny Vitaliev
 Viktor Sharlakhov as Arkady  Anyutin 
 Larisa Pashkova	as 	Sychova
 Yuri Leonidov as Philip Kolesnitsyn
 Aleksandr Safronov as Lozhkin
 Valentina Telichkina as Nadezhda Pavlovna, Grebeshkov's secretary, Kabachkov's former lover  
 Yuri Gusev as Mitrofan Tikhodonsky
 Veronika Izotova as Kabachkov's secretary
 Valentin Nikulin as Orest Ivanovich Muzhesky

References

External links 
 

1979 films
1970s Russian-language films
Soviet comedy films
1979 comedy films
Films directed by Karen Shakhnazarov
1979 directorial debut films
Soviet films based on plays